Norman Edward D'Amours (born October 14, 1937) is an American Democratic politician who was a member of the United States House of Representatives from New Hampshire from 1975 to 1985.

Early life
Born in Holyoke, Hampden County, Massachusetts, D'Amours attended parochial school in Holyoke and High School in Worcester, Massachusetts. He graduated from Assumption College with a B.A. in 1960 and from Boston University School of Law with an L.L.B. in 1963. He was admitted to the bar in Massachusetts in 1963 and in New Hampshire in 1964. He was also admitted to the bar in the District of Columbia. He was a practicing attorney in New Hampshire and served in the United States Army Reserves.

Career
D'Amours served as assistant attorney general for the state of New Hampshire from 1966 to 1969 and as city prosecutor of Manchester, New Hampshire from 1970 to 1972.

D'Amours served during the 94th, 95th, 96th, 97th, and 98th Congresses as United States Representative for the 1st District of New Hampshire from January 3, 1975 to January 3, 1985. During his tenure, he was an active participant on issues related to banking and finance. He ran for the United States Senate in 1984 against Republican incumbent Gordon J. Humphrey but lost with 41%.

President Bill Clinton appointed D'Amours as the chairman of the National Credit Union Administration (NCUA), and he was subsequently unanimously confirmed by the U.S. Senate. He served seven years, from 1993 to 2000, as chairman of NCUA. This federal government agency has oversight over 11,000 institutions, managing $400 billion in assets.

D'Amours remains active in national politics. He is a partner in Dierman, Wortley, Zola & Associates in Washington, DC.

Family life
The son of Albert and Edna Delvina (LaPlante) D'Amours, he married Helen Elizabeth Manning, and they had three children, Susan, Danielle, and Norman. He resides in Arlington, Virginia.

References

External links

Legacy.com

NCUA bio

Living people
1937 births
Assumption University (Worcester) alumni
Boston University School of Law alumni
Politicians from Holyoke, Massachusetts
New Hampshire lawyers
Democratic Party members of the United States House of Representatives from New Hampshire
Members of Congress who became lobbyists